
Hailstorm Alley is a colloquial term referring to an area of south and central Alberta, Canada where hail storms are frequently produced. These storms frequently produce hail that is damaging to property. This area stretches from High River in southern Alberta, northward through Calgary, through Red Deer to Lacombe and then westward to Rocky Mountain House. It is known to be one of the worst areas in the world for damaging hail produced by thunderstorms. These are regarded as loose boundaries. While this area is common for damaging hailstorms, the reality is damaging hailstorms occur over much of central and southern Alberta every summer. The City of Calgary is regarded as the hailstorm capital of Canada.

Examples of previous storms
In 1991, the City of Calgary experienced a storm that caused $342 million in damages. At the time, it was the most damaging hail storm in Canadian history.

Then on 12 July 2010, the City of Calgary experienced a storm that produced four-centimeter wide hailstones. This storm caused $400 million in damages, beating the previous record.

In August 2014, Hailstorm Alley experienced numerous severe storms that cost $450 million in insured damages. These storms were recorded in Calgary, Airdrie, Red Deer and Rocky Mountain House.

On June 30, 2016, a damaging storm hit the central Alberta town of Ponoka, causing $50 million in damages. This storm produced large hail as well as a tornado.

In May 2017, a damaging storm hit the central Alberta city of Lacombe, causing $68 million in damages.

In July 2018, severe storms hit central Alberta, resulting in $80 million in damages.

On June 13, 2020, a severe storm hit the Cities of Calgary and Airdrie causing extensive damage and flash flooding. The damages have been calculated at around $1.5 billion making this the 4th costliest natural disaster in Canadian history.

Cloud seeding and insurers
In 1996, insurance companies formed the Alberta Severe Weather Management Society and began the Alberta Hail Suppression Project. This project uses cloud seeding techniques to lessen the severity of hail storms. This society had budgeted $2.5 million in 2012 to run the suppression project, with the potential to save insurers many times this amount during one single storm by reducing claims. Cloud seeding has never been statistically proven to work.

See also
 Tornado Alley

References

External links
 Where is the Canadian 'hail storm alley'? at The Weather Network

Geography of Alberta
Economy of Alberta
Natural history of Canada
Regions of Canada
Hail